Barton House may refer to:

Abraham Barton House, Lexington, Kentucky, listed on the National Register of Historic Places (NRHP) in Fayette County, Kentucky
Barton House (Florissant, Missouri)
Guy C. Barton House, Omaha, Nebraska
George Barton House, Buffalo, New York
Pauline Cheek Barton House, Memphis, Tennessee, listed on the NRHP in Shelby County, Tennessee
Barton House (Salado, Texas)
William Barton House, Beaver, Utah, listed on the NRHP in Beaver County, Utah
Barton Villa, also known as Barton House, Redlands, California

See also
Barton Hall, Cherokee, Alabama
Barton-Lackey Cabin, Mineral King, California
Clara Barton National Historic Site, Glen Echo, Maryland
Clara Barton Homestead, Oxford, Massachusetts
Reed and Barton Complex, Taunton, Massachusetts
Barton Historic District, West Bend, Wisconsin, listed on the NRHP in Washington County, Wisconsin